Group A of the 2001 Fed Cup Asia/Oceania Zone Group I was one of two pools in the Asia/Oceania Zone Group I of the 2001 Fed Cup. Five teams competed in a round robin competition, with the top team advancing to the Group I play-off, the winner of which would advance to World Group II Play-offs, and the bottom team being relegated down to 2002 Group II.

Pacific Oceania vs. Indonesia

South Korea vs. New Zealand

Indonesia vs. New Zealand

Pacific Oceania vs. India

Indonesia vs. South Korea

India vs. New Zealand

Indonesia vs. India

Pacific Oceania vs. South Korea

South Korea vs. India

Pacific Oceania vs. New Zealand

  failed to win any ties in the pool, and thus were relegated to Group II in 2002, where they finished third.

See also
Fed Cup structure

References

External links
 Fed Cup website

2001 Fed Cup Asia/Oceania Zone